Catherine Waller is a New Zealand-American television writer and actress.

Early life and education 
Catherine Waller was born in Auckland, New Zealand, to Wendy Waller and John Waller, who are both Americans. Waller attended Avondale College. She graduated with a BFA in Acting at Toi Whakaari.

Career 
In 2014, Waller's solo work The Creeps, first premiered in Hollywood Fringe. In 2018, she featured in an episode of Netflix's Love. Waller co-wrote The Luring, a 2017, short film where she also starred as Laura. She played the role of Krissy in Confessions of a Teenage Jesus Jerk.

Awards 
For her role as Amber on the New Zealand TV series, Hounds, she was nominated for the 2013 TV Guide Best On The Box Award. In the 2014 Hollywood Fringe Festival Awards, Waller won the Golden Elephant Award for The Creeps. The Creeps was also nominated for United Solo & Backstage Audience Award. Waller is also a winner of Best Physical Theatre and Best Interactive show at United Solo Festival.

Personal life 
In 2011, Waller and her sister Amy produced a play, Gloria, to honor the life of their grandmother, Gloria Stanford. In 2011 Waller came out as gay and in 2021, married her wife.

References

External links 

Living people
New Zealand expatriate actresses in the United States
Actors from Auckland
Year of birth missing (living people)